The Cornfed Derby Dames (CFDD) is a women's flat track roller derby league based in Muncie, Indiana. Founded in 2010, Cornfed is a member of the Women's Flat Track Derby Association (WFTDA).

History and structure
The league was founded in early 2010, holding initial practices at Muncie Alliance Church before moving to the larger facility at Gibson Roller Skating Arena, and in February 2019, the Delaware County Fairgrounds began hosting home games.  By 2012, the league was playing numerous bouts against leagues such as the South Bend Roller Girls, and was reported as having a major impact on the lives of some of its skaters.

Cornfed was accepted as a member of the Women's Flat Track Derby Association Apprentice Program in July 2012, and it became a full WFTDA member in September 2013.

Founded in 2010 as a single team, the Cornfed Derby Dames added their first B-team in January 2016, the Muncie MissFits. The competitive season runs from February through July every year.

WFTDA competition

Rankings

References

Sports in Muncie, Indiana
Roller derby leagues established in 2010
Roller derby leagues in Indiana
 
2010 establishments in Indiana